Verrucaria rhizicola is a rare species of corticolous (bark-dwelling), aquatic, crustose lichen in the family Verrucariaceae. Found in France, it was formally described as a new species in 2011 by lichenologists André Aptroot and Holger Thüs. There, the lichen was growing on the roots of common alder (Alnus glutinosa). It is only known from the type collection. The species epithet rhizicola refers to its growth on roots. The roots holding the lichen are located along a stream in a temperate forest, and as such, the lichen is regularly immersed in fresh water. Verrucaria rhizicola is one of about 20 corticolous species in genus Verrucaria. In addition to its uncommon habitat, other unique characteristics of this species are the prominent, minute, shiny ascomata that have a distinctive dimidiate involucrellum (the upper, often pigmented part of ascocarps), and the asymmetrically kidney-shaped ascospores.

See also
List of Verrucaria species

References

rhizicola
Lichen species
Lichens described in 2011
Lichens of Southwestern Europe
Taxa named by André Aptroot
Aquatic fungi